Althorpe railway station serves the village of Althorpe in North Lincolnshire, England. The station is also very close to the villages of Keadby, Gunness and Burringham.

Most services are provided by Northern Trains who operate the station.  Occasional services by TransPennine Express also call at this station.

The station is unstaffed and has very limited facilities.  There is a shelter on each platform, with a telephone and a help point for contact with Customer Services and British Transport Police on Platform 1 (eastbound); train running information is also provided by timetable posters on each side. Platform 2 (westbound) is accessible only by a footbridge with 50 steps.

The station is on the west bank of the River Trent, to the west of the combined road-and-rail King George V Bridge, which was a lifting bridge until the late 1950s.

History
The first Althorpe station, opened by the Manchester, Sheffield and Lincolnshire Railway, was on the original line over the Trent and replaced the terminus, Keadby, on the South Yorkshire Railway, which became Keadby Goods. This station was originally known as Keadby and Althorpe.

When the line was again moved to a new alignment to cross the river by the present "King George V" bridge a new station was opened which is still in use. It replaced two earlier stations, Althorpe and Gunness & Burringham, which had been about half a mile apart.

The station which now bears the name, became part of the London and North Eastern Railway during the Grouping of 1923. The station then passed to the Eastern Region of British Railways on nationalisation in 1948.

When Sectorisation was introduced in the 1980s, the station was served by Regional Railways until the Privatisation of British Railways.

Gallery

Services
With no service on a Sunday.

Currently, that has been reduced to a rail replacement bus service every 2 hours, again with no services on a Sunday.

In February 2013 the line northeast of Hatfield and Stainforth station towards Thorne was blocked by the Hatfield Colliery landslip, with all services over the section halted. The line reopened in July 2013.

References

External links 

 Station on navigable O.S. map

Railway stations in the Borough of North Lincolnshire
DfT Category F2 stations
Former Great Central Railway stations
Railway stations in Great Britain opened in 1866
Railway stations in Great Britain closed in 1916
Railway stations in Great Britain opened in 1916
Railway stations served by TransPennine Express
Northern franchise railway stations
1866 establishments in England